The Capture of the Rif took place in 1792 and was orchestrated by the Bey of the west, Mohammed el-Kebir, to capture the Rif region in northern Morocco.

Background 

Since the late 17th century the Algerians were able to gain possession and recognition of sovereignty over a portion of eastern Morocco around Oujda, initially after a set of victories against the Moroccan Sultan Ismail Ibn Sharif in engagements such as the Battle of Moulouya, and the Siege of Oran in which the Deylik of Algiers and Spain cooperated against Morocco.

Capture 
In 1792 the Algerians managed to conquer and take control of the Rif region in Morocco.

Aftermath 
Between 1795 and 1798 the Algerians abandoned the Rif region along with the eastern part of Morocco that they had reigned over just before the arrival of an expedition that was sent by the Alaouite Sultan, Mulay Sulayman, to re-capture these regions. The Bey of Mascara put up no resistance, and with the capture of the region in 1795, the border between the Regency of Algiers and Morocco was definitively fixed at Wadi Kiss. which brought an end to the conflicts between the Algerians and Moroccans.

References

Rif
Rif
Wars involving Morocco
Wars involving Algeria
18th century in Morocco
18th century in Algeria
1792 in Africa
Rif